"Precious" is a song by Scottish singer and songwriter Annie Lennox, released on 25 May 1992 as the second single from her debut solo album, Diva (1992). It peaked at number 23 in the UK and was a top 10 hit in Italy. The B-side, "Step by Step", was later covered by Whitney Houston for the soundtrack of her 1996 film, The Preacher's Wife, and became a top 10 hit. "Precious" is unrelated to the B-side track of the same name on the single "Revival" by Eurythmics.

Critical reception
Robbert Tilli from Music & Media described "Precious" as a "Stevie Wonderesque funk-edged song". Alan Jones from Music Week named it Pick of the Week, commenting, "Not as immediate as "Why", but a stylish little offering with few pretentions. Peppy uptempo pop/rock, and highly engaging, this is certain to keep demand for Lennox's Diva album at a high level." A reviewer from People Magazine noted the "passion" the singer does on the song. Pop Rescue complimented its "wonderfully thick plodding bass line", adding that Lennox' vocals "are rich here, and she has the space to give some higher notes too." 

Harry Dean from Smash Hits declared it as "pleasantly melodic". Craig S. Semon from Telegram & Gazette wrote, "On "Precious", Lennox's tarnished Eurythmics' mystique and her newly found solo freedom finally fall into place. With intense vocals, she romances an angel (obviously a song to her 18-month-old daughter, Lola), while a funky program and a jazzy horn solo keep the song grooving. She effectively conveys the love she feels for her little bundle of joy, explaining how it has changed her life and replaced all her bitterness." He added, "The song is one of the album's better numbers and it has all the passion and intensity of a successful Lisa Stansfield outing".

Track listing

Charts

Similar songs
The Tony Cetinski's song "Onaj ko te ljubi sretan je" (2005) and the SevdahBABY's song "Najbolja pesma" (2010) (featuring Anette & Djixx) contain the sample of the chorus melody of the Annie Lennox' song "Precious".

References

External links
 YouTube - "Precious" video

1992 songs
1992 singles
Annie Lennox songs
Songs written by Annie Lennox
Song recordings produced by Stephen Lipson
Arista Records singles